Did you mean: Human?
Humin may refer to:
Humin, a compound of soil
Humin, Palpa, in Nepal
Humin, Poland